The following lists events that happened during 2014 in Nicaragua.

Incumbents 
 President: Daniel Ortega

Events

August
 August 30 - Twenty gold miners are rescued from a collapsed mine. Five still remain missing however.

October
 October 18 - 22 people are killed in heavy rainfall, with 9 killed in the capital of Managua by a wall collapse.

See also
List of years in Nicaragua

References

 
Nicaragua
2010s in Nicaragua
Years of the 21st century in Nicaragua
Nicaragua